Schefflera myriantha is a species of plant in the family Araliaceae. It is found in Burundi, Comoros, the Democratic Republic of the Congo, Ethiopia, Kenya, Madagascar, Malawi, Rwanda, Tanzania, Uganda, and possibly in Sudan.

References

myriantha
Least concern plants
Taxonomy articles created by Polbot
Taxobox binomials not recognized by IUCN